Suo Ran (索冉, born 19 August 1994) is a Chinese swimmer who won a silver medal in the 50 breaststroke at the 2014 Asian Games.

References

1994 births
Living people
Chinese female freestyle swimmers
Swimmers from Henan
Asian Games silver medalists for China
Medalists at the 2014 Asian Games
Asian Games medalists in swimming
Swimmers at the 2014 Asian Games
Swimmers at the 2018 Asian Games
Chinese female breaststroke swimmers
21st-century Chinese women